J. B. Mangharam & Company was a maker of biscuits in India. It was founded in 1919.

In 1950s they were the largest biscuit producer in Asia and produced several type of biscuits and confectioneries. They were initially famous for their "Energy Food" biscuits made using glucose. They were originally intended for British soldiers, but became popular among children. Later they were also known for the cream wafer biscuits.

The Mangharams were originally from Sukkur Sindh, but had branches in Bombay, Calcutta and Delhi. The Gwalior factory was established in 1951. After the death of J. B. Mangharam himself, the company was restructured in 1969 and 1977 and in 1983 became a part of the Britannia Industries Ltd  and no longer produces biscuits with the  J.B Mangharam label.

The Sukkur factory was established in 1937. During the partition of India, the building was declared evacuee property and after partition it was allotted to Muhammad Yakoob and was renamed Yacoob Biscuit Factory.

It was once considered of the top few Sindhi owned companies along with Kaycee's Blue Star, Motwaney's Chicago Radio. The Mangharam family arrived in Gwalior sometime in 1940s. They negotiated special tax concessions with the then Madhya Bharat government. As a result of their support a large number of Sindhis came and settled in Gwalior after the partition.

The brightly colored tins of J.B. Mangharam biscuits and sweets produced in 1950s and 1960s, featuring pictures from Indian tradition (Shakuntala and Bharat, Mira Bai, baby Krishna, Krishna with flute) and selected cities (Mumbai VT, Kolkata Howra Bridge, Amritsar Golden temple) are now regarded as collectibles.

See also
Parle-G Parle Glucose biscuits

References

Bakeries of India
Sukkur District